Wilfried Decoo (born 1946) is a Flemish academic.  He is a professor with the department of French and Italian at Brigham Young University and also a professor at the University of Antwerp.  Decoo is also a contributor to the Mormon blog Times and Seasons.

Decoo has a B.A. from UFSIA (Antwerp Jesuit University, presently merged into University of Antwerp) and an M.A. from Ghent University.  His Ph.D. is from Brigham Young University.  Decoo is a convert to the Church of Jesus Christ of Latter-day Saints.  Decoo has served multiple terms as the chair of the department of education at the University of Antwerp.

Among books by Decoo are Systemization in Foreign Language Teaching: Monitoring Content Progression (Routledge Research in Education) and Crisis on Campus: Confronting Academic Misconduct the later published by the Massachusetts Institute of Technology.

References

External links
Times and Seasons bio of Decoo
Mormon Scholars testify bio
MIT Press entry on Decoo

1946 births
Living people
Belgian Latter Day Saints
Converts to Mormonism
Ghent University alumni
Brigham Young University alumni
Brigham Young University faculty
Academic staff of the University of Antwerp
Flemish academics